Gao Yi (born April 21, 1980 in Cangshan, Fuzhou) is a Chinese sprint canoer who competed in the mid-2000s. At the 2004 Summer Olympics, she finished seventh in the K-4 500 m event.

References

1980 births
Canoeists at the 2004 Summer Olympics
Chinese female canoeists
Living people
Olympic canoeists of China
Asian Games medalists in canoeing
Sportspeople from Fujian
Canoeists at the 2002 Asian Games
Medalists at the 2002 Asian Games
Asian Games silver medalists for China